Sheinberg is a surname which derives from the Yiddish words for "pretty" (shein) and "mountain" (berg). Notable people with this name include:

Carrie Sheinberg (born 1972), American skier
Chaim Pinchas Scheinberg (1910–2012), Israeli rabbi
David A. Scheinberg, American physician
Herbert Scheinberg (ca. 1919 – 2009), American physician
Isai Scheinberg (born ca. 1946), founder of an online poker site
Katya Scheinberg, Russian-American applied mathematician
Mark Scheinberg (born 1973), Israeli-Canadian businessman
Sidney Sheinberg (1935–2019), American entertainment executive
Moises Sheinberg (Born 1966), Mexican Writer